The Medical Missionary Society in China was a Protestant medical missionary society established in Canton, China, in 1838.

The first work of the society was to support the ophthalmic hospital in Canton run by Dr. Peter Parker, a medical missionary of the American Board of Commissioners for Foreign Missions. The founder and first president was Dr. Thomas Richardson Colledge. The society split in 1845 when some of the members moved to Hong Kong. Only the Canton society continued into the twentieth century. In its heyday the society supported mission hospitals staffed by British and American doctors at Canton, Hong Kong, Macao, Amoy, Ningpo and Shanghai. A number of young Chinese men were trained in Western medicine in the society's hospitals in the early days.

See also 
 Medical missions
 Medical missions in China

References
 
 Wong, K. Chimin and Lien-Teh, Wu (1936), 'History of Chinese Medicine', 2nd edition, Shanghai: National Quarantine Service 
 Couling, Samuel (1917), 'Encyclopaedia Sinica', London: Oxford University Press 
 Lockhart, William (1861). 'A Medical Missionary in China', London: Hurst and Blackett 
 Parker, Peter (1843), 'Report of the Medical Missionary Society 1841-1842', Macao 
 Colledge, Thomas Richardson and Parker, Peter (1838), 'Address and Minutes of Proceedings of the Medical Missionary Society Canton, China 1838', Canton: Office of the Chinese Repository
 Choa, G. H. (1990), 'Heal the sick was their motto : the Protestant medical missionaries in China', Hong Kong : Chinese University Press

Christian missionary societies
Christian missions in China
Christian organizations established in the 19th century
Medicine in China
Religious organizations established in 1838
1838 establishments in China